Saint-Laurent-de-Terregatte is a commune in the Manche department in Normandy in north-western France. The commune is situated in the south of the Avranchin area. It is 6.5 km southeast of Ducey, 8.5 km northeast of Saint-James and 16 km west of Saint-Hilaire-du-Harcouët.

See also
Communes of the Manche department

References

Saintlaurentdeterregatte